Systematic Theology: An Introduction to Biblical Doctrine is a 1994  book by the American Christian theologian Wayne Grudem. An introductory textbook, Systematic Theology covers several theological topics in Christian systematic theology. It is published by Zondervan, and is written from an Evangelical, Reformed perspective. It is one of the most widely sold and distributed books in the United States on the subject of Christian systematic theology, and one of the bestselling Protestant theology books in the country.

References

Christian theology books
1994 non-fiction books
Zondervan books